Alec Anderson may refer to:
 Alec Anderson (American football, born 1894)
 Alec Anderson (American football, born 1999)

See also
 Alex Anderson (disambiguation)